The Human Resources Development Fund (HRDF) is a Saudi governmental authority that was established by a royal decree in July 2000. It falls under the Saudi Ministry of Labor and Social Development.

HRDF is mainly concerned with providing financial support to organizations that train and qualify Saudis in the private sector. Thus, in order to motivate the private sector in Saudi Arabia to hire Saudi citizens, HRDF pays 30% of the salaries paid to Saudis working in the private sector in the first year of employment. Moreover, Hadaf supports Saudi entrepreneurs.

Online Portal 
HRDF has launched an online portal to facilitate entrepreneurs. The portal provides an interactive support to entrepreneurs and small businesses throughout the phases of project establishment. This includes giving them ideas, financial solutions and information to help them making decisions.

Saudi Women Empowerment Program 
The program aims at encouraging Saudi women to enter the workforce in Saudi Arabia. HRDF has launched two programs namely, ‘Qurrat’ and ‘Wusool’. "Qurrat" is responsible for providing the working mothers a hospitality service for their children, "Wusool" provides Saudi female workers with the necessary transportation fees. However, "Wusool" program has received criticism by many working ladies as it does not pay such fees for female employees until they complete working for three years in the same private company.

E-summer Camp 
In 2019, HADAF launched an online training course program in collaboration with a number of parties. The main aim of the program is to qualify university students, fresh graduates and entrepreneurs and prepare them for the job market.

Maher 12/12

Maher 12/12  is a program of the Saudi Human Resources Development Fund in the context of its quest for specialized national job opportunities related to work in the private sector by directing job seekers to enroll in educational programs needed by the labor market through the “Maher” program 12/12 to qualify specialized cadres, which is a training program not related to training and qualification in the professions needed by the labor market. It is expected that the program will benefit (12,000) applications to operate a work platform, and it is expected that the program will become (12,000). The training programs were selected based on the needs of the labor market, and the training agencies that achieved outstanding success in training were also selected, which will help, God willing, the outputs of those programs in obtaining job opportunities in the private sector. These handbooks have become the program's work controls.

See also 

 Ministry of Labor and Social Development 
Saudization

External links 
Human Resources Development Fund /

References 

Government agencies of Saudi Arabia
2000 establishments in Saudi Arabia